Don't Stay is the third single released by Irish R&B recording artist Laura Izibor, from her debut studio album Let The Truth Be Told.

Music video
The music video for this song was released on June 16, 2009 and it was directed by Noble Jones. It starts with Laura singing and playing a piano while small sequences of her and her apparent boyfriend are arguing throughout the video. Nearing the end, it shows Izibor standing in front of an open door as her boyfriend leaves, with her closing the door as the clip ends.

Charts

References

External links
 Laura Izibor - "Don't Stay" at YouTube

Laura Izibor songs
2009 singles
2009 songs
Atlantic Records singles